Scott John High (born 15 February 2001) is a professional footballer who plays as a midfielder for Huddersfield Town and the Scotland national under-21 team.

Born in England, he represents Scotland at youth level.

Club career
Born in Dewsbury, High began his career with Huddersfield Town. He moved on loan to Concord Rangers in November 2019 until January 2020, but was recalled by Huddersfield a month later. He returned to Concord Rangers in February 2020 for a second loan spell.

High made his senior debut for Huddersfield on 22 July 2020, the last day of the 2019–20 season. On 3 August 2020, he joined League One side Shrewsbury Town on loan for the 2020–21 season. He scored his first senior career goal on 4 September 2020, netting for Shrewsbury in a 4–3 away defeat to Middlesbrough in an EFL Cup match. On 29 December 2020 it was announced that his loan deal had ended. He joined Rotherham United on a season-long loan on 29 July 2022. However, his loan was terminated on 11 January 2023.

International career
High was first named in the Scotland under-21 squad in August 2021. As of August 2022, he had made seven appearances without scoring.

Career statistics

References

2001 births
Living people
Huddersfield Town A.F.C. players
Concord Rangers F.C. players
Shrewsbury Town F.C. players
Rotherham United F.C. players
English Football League players
Association football midfielders
National League (English football) players
English footballers
Footballers from Dewsbury
English people of Scottish descent
Scotland under-21 international footballers
Scottish footballers